The Kigezi Wildlife Reserve is a game reserve established in 1952 in Uganda.

References

Wildlife sanctuaries of Uganda